Faegheh Atashin (born 5 May 1950), known professionally as Googoosh, is an Iranian singer and 
former actress. One of the most popular and prolific entertainers in Iran, her career has spanned over six decades. Googoosh has enjoyed significant popularity since the beginning of her career, ultimately becoming a cultural icon inside Iran and abroad.

She is mainly known for her contributions to Iranian pop music, but she also starred in a variety of Persian movies from the 1950s to the 1970s. She achieved the pinnacle of her fame and success towards the end of the 1970s. In the 1970s, Googoosh was widely emulated by Iranian women, as they copied her clothing (miniskirts) and her short haircut (known as the "Googooshi"). Following the Iranian Revolution in 1979, she remained in Tehran until 2000 and did not perform again during that period due to the ban on female singers. Younger generations of Iranians have rediscovered her music via bootleg recordings. After leaving Iran in 2000, she performed a total of 27 concerts in European and North American countries in that year. Recent projects include a new collaboration with Iranian singer-songwriter Hassan Shamaizadeh from her 2012 album Ejaz, as well as serving as head judge and head of academy for the popular reality show Googoosh Music Academy broadcast on London-based satellite channel Manoto 1.

Since her return to the stage in the summer of 2000, she has performed in concerts and venues all around the world, including the Madison Square Garden in New York, the Air Canada Centre in Toronto, the Ericsson Globe in Stockholm, Honda Center in Anaheim, Royal Albert Hall in London and the Hollywood Bowl in Los Angeles  She has recorded songs in many languages including Persian, Azerbaijani, Turkish, English, Spanish, Italian, Arabic, Armenian and French. She has a significant following outside of Iran and has even received the attention of European and African media and press.

Biography

Early life

Googoosh was born as Faegheh Atashin on 5 May 1950, in Tehran, to Azerbaijani parents who emigrated from the Azerbaijan Soviet Socialist Republic of the Soviet Union. She was quickly called "Googoosh", an Armenian name normally exclusively used for boys but which became her stage name. In an interview she noted that she was called Googoosh from a very early age; in her birth certificate however her birth name Faegheh is recorded.

Career before the Revolution (1953–1979)

During the 1970s, Googoosh began a meteoric rise to fame and success as she drove the edge of Iranian pop music further and further. Known for her flamboyant outfits and fashion sense, Googoosh wowed her pop-culture-hungry fans in Iran and abroad with her trademark hairdos and hip-elegant style, inspiring many Iranian women to copy her hairdos. Her music ranged from upbeat 1960s and 1970s pop, given a traditional-tinged edge, to declamatory, emotional ballads dealing with love and loss, comparable to the chanson style of music by artists like Édith Piaf. Her music was popular among non-Persian-speaking audiences as well. The Spanish singer Julio Iglesias covered the song Bavar Kon. She starred in over 25 movies, one of which was to be the most commercially successful Iranian motion picture of all time. Googoosh performed many times for the royal family and was a favorite of Shah Mohammad Reza Pahlavi's wife and children. She performed at the party given for the 17th birthday of Reza Pahlavi, Crown Prince of Iran.

At the time of the Iranian Revolution in 1979, Googoosh was in Los Angeles. However, feeling homesick, she decided to return to Iran. In response to why she remained in Iran after the revolution, she said that it was "out of love of her for her homeland". Despite being a symbol of many things that the revolution tried to overturn, especially related to perceptions of excessive Westernization, Googoosh remained in Iran for years afterward. After the revolution, Googoosh, like other artists, was forbidden from performing and her material was banned. She would not perform again until Mohammad Khatami's presidency, during which she was allowed to tour outside of the country.

Comeback (2000–present)

Googoosh left Iran and went to Canada in 2000, after being in Iran for 21 years following the Iranian Revolution. BMusic's Taghinia, says "Googoosh is the siren of that era [Pre-revolution] and important in that she's really a direct link to Iran's past." Chicago Tribune considers the return of Googoosh to be "more than just a pop milestone" but instead "a cultural marker, a measure of the way change occurs in a society that for more than two decades has tried to resist the tide of globalization by living in self-imposed isolation."

In 2000, Googoosh sang in public, away from her homeland, for the first time after 21 years of silence to the acclaim of many long-time fans. The Googoosh Comeback Tour was a series of concerts starting in July 2000. She began with a sold-out concert at the Air Canada Centre in Toronto on 29 July 2000 (with an audience of more than 12,000), and eventually brought the tour to a conclusion in Dubai on 21 and 24 March 2001 on the occasion of the Iranian New Year, Nowruz. Her concert in Dubai was considered a homecoming for her, and out of the more than 20,000 members of the audience, seventy percent of them were Iranians who had crossed the Persian Gulf to hear her. The two Dubai concerts held special importance: it was the tour finale, and Googoosh was rumored to be planning to return to Iran.

In 2000, a feature-length documentary called Googoosh: Iran's Daughter was released which chronicled the singer's life and her icon-status while detailing the socio-political turmoil that led to the 1979 Revolution in Iran. Made by Iranian-American filmmaker Farhad Zamani, the documentary began production in 1998 and was made at a time when Googoosh was still forbidden to give interviews.

In January 2009, she ended her work and career with Mehrdad Asemani, citing "creative differences," and in March 2009 began a new work relationship with her current management team. On 21 and 24 March of that year, during Nowruz, Googoosh performed in Dubai.

Googoosh and other speakers participated in a 22 July 2009 protest at the United Nations which attracted exiles from Iran. They stood in front of a banner with names of Iranian protestors who they believed were still incarcerated and of other protestors, written in red, who had been killed. During this protest, Googoosh made a speech stating that she entered politics because of the outcome of the 2009 Iranian presidential election. She said, "I have come here to be the voice for the sad mothers who lost their loved ones in peaceful demonstrations. I have come here to be the just voice of the grass-roots and spontaneous movement among my compatriots and to show my solidarity."

Beginning in 2011, she served as head-of-academy and head-judge alongside Hooman Khalatbari and Babak Saeedi for the widely popular talent show/singing competition Googoosh Music Academy, which was broadcast on the London-based Iranian satellite channel Manoto 1 and was their most watched program. Googoosh Music Academy lasted three seasons. In December 2010, Googoosh held a very notable concert in the Kurdish region of Iraq, to which tens of thousands of Iranians came from Tehran and beyond.

In 2010, Googoosh ran a Persian talent competition show called Googoosh Music Academy.  The series ran in Europe and Middle East on Monoto TV channes.

In March 2011, Googoosh released a snippet of a new song she was working on, titled Bedrood, via YouTube. In April 2011, she debuted her latest project. The singer launched her own cosmetic collection sold online, titled Googoosh Cosmetics. In April 2011, she held a concert at the Nokia Theatre in Los Angeles, as well as a record breaking performance at the same venue on 27 October 2012, as a part of her worldwide Ejaz Tour. Also on 26 March 2013 she performed at London's Royal Albert Hall for the first time, where other notable Persian vocalists such as Elaheh, Ebi and Marzieh have performed memorable concerts in the past.

In 2012, Googoosh released her 6th studio album since her comeback, titled Ejaz. The album consisted of 10 tracks, featuring collaborations with Hassan Shamaizadeh (Hayahoo) and three songs wherein she collaborated with her fellow Googoosh Music Academy judge Babak Saeedi and with Raha Etemadi (Nagoo Bedrood and Noghteye Payan and Hese Mobham). She also collaborated with Alireza Afkari and Roozbeh Bemani on three songs (E'jaz and Baraye Man and Behesht). Another single Bi Manoto was a musical rendition of a poem by the Persian poet Rumi. The poem came to Googoosh's attention while she was banned from singing at the time of the Iran–Iraq War. She stated that she felt inspired by the lyrics and therefore created her own melody and was finally presented with the opportunity to record it as she had long hoped to do.

In February 2014, she released a music video of the song Behesht, in support of the gay and lesbian community in Iran, which faces significant challenges in its struggle for equal rights, including the ongoing threat of the death penalty for convictions related to sexual orientation. This made her the first prominent Iranian with a huge following to speak out against homophobia in Iran.

On 21 March 2015, Googoosh released her 7th album titled Aks-e Khosoosi (Private Portrait) including 11 tracks from different songwriters and composers such as Babak Sahraee, Nickan Ebrahimi, Babak Amini (Googoosh band leader). The first song of this album is Che Ziba Bood, which is also the last song that was composed by Varujan.

Despite the political and personal hardships she has endured, Googoosh has continued to be a beloved figure over the last half century.

Personal life

Googoosh has three half-brothers on her father's side and a brother and sister on her mother's side. One of her brothers died in his youth.

In 1980, Googoosh was imprisoned for nearly one month after the Iranian Revolution. In 2018, in reply to a question by interviewer about how she stays young, she said, "Love, music and lots of fruit!".

Marriages 
Googoosh's first husband was Mahmoud Ghorbani, a cabaret owner and music promoter who had helped Googoosh make a name for herself throughout the 1960s. Googoosh and Ghorbani married in February 1967. They had a son, Kambiz. After about six years of marriage, Ghorbani and Googoosh divorced in late 1972. 

In 1975, Googoosh married Iranian actor Behrouz Vossoughi; they divorced fourteen months later in 1976. During their brief marriage they were considered to be the country's biggest celebrity power couple. During the late 1970s, Googoosh became involved with Homayoun Mesdaghi, and married him in 1979. Six years later, in 1985, she divorced Mesdaghi. She then married director Masoud Kimiai in 1991. They divorced in 2005.

Discography

Studio albums
 1970: Do Panjereh (Two Windows)
 1970: Fasle Tazeh (New Season)
 1971: Mordab (The Swamp)
 1971: Nimeye Gomshodeye Man (My Lost Half)
 1972: Kooh (The Mountain)
1973: Mano Gonjeshkaye Khooneh (Me and the house Sparrows)
 1974: Do Mâhi (Two Fish)
 1974: Hamsafar (Co-Traveler)
 1975: Pol (The Bridge)
 1975: Mosabbeb (With Dariush)
 1977: Dar emtedâde shab (Along the Night)
 1978: Ageh bemouni (If You Stay)

Albums (since her return to music in 2000)
 2000: Zartosht (Zoroaster)
 2004: Akharin Khabar (Latest News)
 2005: Manifest
 2008: Shab-e Sepid (White Night)
 2010: Hajm-e Sabz (Green Volume)
 2012: E'jaz (Miracle)
 2015: Aks-e Khosoosi (Private Portrait)
 2021: Twenty One (21)

Singles (After her return to music)
 2004: QQ Bang Bang "On YouTube"
 2011: Ye Harfaei (Live TV Performance On Manoto1)
 2014: Nostalgia (ft. Ebi)
 2014: Do Panjereh (ft. Ebi)
 2014: Ki Ashkato Pak Mikoneh (ft. Ebi)
 2014: Hamzad (Twin) (New Arrangement)
 2016: Hastamo Nistam (I am and I am not)
 2017: Do Panjereh (Two Windows) (New Version)
 2017: Sogand (Oath)
 2018: Mosalas-e Khatereha (The Memory Triangle) (ft. Hassan Shamaizadeh)
 2018: Ajab Jaei (What a Place)
2018: Roya (Dream) "Unofficial Version Of The Witness"
2018: Shahed (Witness)
 2018: 40 Saal (40 years) (ft. Siavash Ghomayshi)
 2018: Talagh "Remix 2018" (Divorce)
 2018: Mordab "Live Version" (The Swamp) (ft. Hassan Shamaizadeh)
 2018: Refaghat (Friendship) (ft. Martik)
 2019: Eshghe Kamyab (Rare Love) (ft. Martik)
 2019: Darde Man (My Pain)
2020: Fardamon (Our Tomorrow)
 2020: Harigh (Fire)
2021: Gohare Kamyab (Rare Gem)
 2021: Tooye Tehran (In Tehran) (Demo Recording In 2017)
 2022: Rooze Khoob  (Good Day) (Recorded 43 years ago)
 2022: Naaz Edkeh (Southern Song)
 2022: Safar Mikonam (l Travel)
 2022: Ghesseye Do Maahi "Live Version" (The Story Of Two Fish) (ft. Shahyar Ghanbari)
 2022: Geryeh Dar Ragbaar (Crying in a barrage) (Recorded 44 years ago)
 2022: Dobareh (Again) (ft. Leila Forouhar, Shahrzad Sepanlou, Darya Dadvar, Sogand & Shohreh Aghdashloo)

Filmography

Googoosh also acted in two other movies: Mard-e keraye-i (مرد کرایه‌ای) and Hajji Firuz (حاجی فیروز), but the production of each of these films was suspended during the final stages for unknown reasons. Googoosh has also acted in many television shows and commercials in Iran.

Awards and achievements 

 1971: first prize and gold record at the Midem trade fair in Cannes for her 7" record (as "Gougoush") performing two songs in French produced by Barclay Records: "Retour de la Ville"  (A-side) and "J'entends Crier Je T'aime" (B-side).
1972: Performed at Cantagiro Music Festival.
 1972: Performed at the Carthage Music Festival
 1972: First medal of arts of Tunisia
 1973: The best actress for Bita in Iranian Sepas film festival.
 1973: Recorded soundtrack (produced by RCA Records) of San Remo Music Festival.
2001: Performed at the Carthage Music Festival.
 2014: Best Iranian Singer (World Music Awards)
 2017: Best Music Video For Do Panjereh (Directed by Yasmin Asha)(Festigious Film Awards March 2017)
 Two awards from Microsoft Theatre in Los Angeles for record breaking performances
 2022: Performed at the Expo Festival.

See also
 List of Iranian women

References

External links

 
 
 

1950 births
Azerbaijani-language singers
Exiles of the Iranian Revolution in the United States
Iranian film actresses
Iranian people of Azerbaijani descent
Iranian emigrants to the United States
Iranian women pop singers
20th-century Iranian women singers
Iranian pop singers
Iranian television personalities
Living people
Persian-language singers
English-language singers
French-language singers
Singers from Tehran